The Yuzhnaya Anva is a river in Perm Krai, Russia, a left tributary of the Utva, which in turn is a tributary of the Veslyana. The main tributary is the Severnaya Anva (left).

References 

Rivers of Perm Krai